Internet censorship in Syria is extensive. Syria bans websites for political reasons and arrests people accessing them. Filtering and blocking was found to be pervasive in the political and Internet tools areas, and selective in the social and conflict/security areas by the OpenNet Initiative in August 2009.

Internet connectivity between Syria and the outside world shut down in late November 2011, and again in early May 2013. Syria's Internet was cut off more than ten times in 2013, and again in March 2014. The Syrian government blamed terrorists for the cut off.

Overview 
Syria has been on Reporters Without Borders' Enemy of the Internet list since 2006 when the list was established. In 2009, the Committee to Protect Journalists named Syria number three in a list of the ten worst countries in which to be a blogger, given the arrests, harassment, and restrictions which online writers in Syria faced. In May 2012 the Committee to Protect Journalists named Syria the third most censored country in the world, saying: 
In its campaign to silence media coverage, the government disabled mobile phones, landlines, electricity, and the Internet. Authorities have routinely extracted passwords of social media sites from journalists through beatings and torture. The pro-government online group the Syrian Electronic Army has frequently hacked websites to post pro-regime material, and the government has been implicated in malware attacks targeted at those reporting on the crisis.

In addition to filtering a wide range of Web content, the Syrian government monitors Internet use very closely and has detained citizens "for expressing their opinions or reporting information online." Vague and broadly worded laws invite government abuse and have prompted Internet users to engage in self-censorship to avoid the state's ambiguous grounds for arrest.

History

Late 2000s
In August 2007 YouTube was blocked after videos circulated denouncing the crackdown on the Kurd minority.

In November 2007 the Syrian government blocked Facebook, explaining that the website promoted attacks on authorities. The Facebook ban, like the ban of most websites, was not entirely effective and many people were able to maintain access using open proxies or other circumvention techniques.

From 30 April 2008 to the present (23 October 2013) the Arabic Wikipedia has been blocked.

Early 2010s
In February 2011 Syria stopped filtering YouTube, Facebook, and Twitter.

Early in the Syrian civil war on 3 June 2011 the government shut down the country's Internet network. Although fully restored the following day, the country's 3G, DSL and dial-up were disconnected the same day massive protests and marches were being organized throughout the country to call for the removal of President Bashar al-Assad and for “Children’s Friday”, to honor children who had died during the uprisings.

On 26 July 2011 the website the-syrian.com, a site dedicated to "granting freedom of speech to everyone, whether against or with the regime", was blocked from within Syria. The site is mostly in Arabic and targeted to Syrian audiences, although it has an English section. A graph that appeared in the Wall Street Journal shows the number of blocked access attempts to the-syrian.com and other sites between August 1 and 5 2011.

In October 2011 US based Blue Coat Systems of Sunnyvale, California acknowledged that Syria is using  its devices to censor Web activity, a possible violation of US trade embargoes. According to an article in the Wall Street Journal information about Blue Coat in Syria began to trickle out in August, after a "hacktivist" group called Telecomix managed to gain access to unsecured servers on Syria's Internet systems and found evidence of Blue Coat filtering. The group found computer records, or logs, detailing which Web pages the Blue Coat devices were censoring in Syria.

In June 2012 the Electronic Frontier Foundation (EFF) reported that pro-Syrian-government malware campaigns have increased in frequency and sophistication and that a new Trojan distributed as a .pif file via Skype targets Syrian activists. The malware gives an attacker the ability to execute arbitrary code on the infected computer. Evidence suggests that this campaign is being carried out by the same pro-Syrian-government hackers responsible for previous attacks. The new Trojan is one in a series used to attack Syrian opposition activists that includes several Trojans, one disguised as a Skype encryption tool, which covertly install spying software onto the infected computer, as well as a multitude of phishing attacks which steal YouTube and Facebook login credentials.

On July 19, 2012, Internet access from Syria traveling via the state carrier Syrian Telecommunications Establishment was cut off for a period of 40 minutes.

On 29 November 2012, almost all Internet connectivity between Syria and the outside world was cut off at around 12:00 to 13:00 UTC+02:00 (local time). This coincided with intense rebel activity inside Syria. In 2014, Edward Snowden alleged that the NSA was responsible.

The Syrian Internet blackout was a break in Syria's Internet connectivity that happened for nineteen hours between 7 and 8 May 2013. Mobile phone and telephone services were also cut. No-one yet has admitted responsibility for the event or can figure out how it happened. The Syrians blamed Cyberterrorists for the incident. It caused worry that the blackout was intended to mask an impending military offensive.

Syria's Internet was cut off more than ten times in 2013, and again in March 2014.

Syrian Electronic Army (SEA)
The Syrian Electronic Army, also known as the Syrian Electronic Soldiers, is a collection of pro-government computer hackers aligned with Syrian President Bashar al-Assad.  The Syrian Electronic Army (SEA) is the first public, virtual army in the Arab world to openly launch cyber attacks on its opponents, though the precise nature of its relationship with the Syrian government is debated.

The SEA claims responsibility for defacing or otherwise compromising hundreds of websites that it contends spread news hostile to the Syrian government. These include news websites such as BBC News, the Associated Press, National Public Radio, Al Jazeera, Financial Times, The Daily Telegraph,  Syrian satellite broadcaster Orient TV, and Dubai-based al-Arabia TV, as well as rights organizations such as Human Rights Watch. Other SEA targets include VoIP apps, such as Viber, and Tango.

The group reportedly uses phishing tactics to gain sufficient information to compromise accounts. In the first week of May 2013, the Twitter account of The Onion was compromised by the SEA, after a phishing attack targeting The Onion employees led to its account being compromised.

In addition to the high-profile defacement and attacks on public targets, the SEA also carries out surveillance to discover the identities and location of Syrian rebels. This electronic monitoring also reportedly extends to foreign aid workers.

See also
 Media of Syria
 Syrian Free Press

References

Syria
Censorship in Syria
Syria
Syria
Internet in Syria
2012 in Syria
2013 in Syria